Archana Sharma is an Indian physicist and senior scientist at the CERN laboratory in Geneva, Switzerland. She is the only Indian scientist at CERN who was involved in the discovery of the Higgs boson particle in 2012. Her research focuses on high energy physics, which explores the origins of the known universe and its component parts. She is internationally recognized for her work in instrumentation and gaseous detectors, specifically for her pioneering work on micro-pattern gaseous detectors.  She also received the Pravasi Bharatiya Samman Award in 2023 which is the highest award that the Indian government can bestow upon an Indian settled abroad. India's President Draupadi Murmu gave her the award for her 'outstanding contribution to science & technology' and in recognition of her 'valuable contribution' in promoting the honour and prestige of India and in fostering the interests of overseas Indians.

Early life and education 
Sharma was born to a middle-class family in Aligarh & raised in Jhansi, Uttar Pradesh. Both of her parents were teachers––her father taught mechanical engineering, and her mother taught economics and geography. The rigor and support of her parents and schoolteachers encouraged her to pursue higher education in physics.

Sharma studied physics at Banaras Hindu University as an undergraduate student and received her masters in nuclear physics from the same university in 1982. In 1989, she received her PhD in experimental particle physics from Delhi University. She describes herself as a "good student [who] had gold medals" in India, but lacked the practical knowledge of instrumentation and building scientific instruments. Sharma earned a second doctorate degree (D.Sc.) in "Instrumentation for High Energy Physics" from the University of Geneva in 1996 and an executive MBA degree from the International University in Geneva in 2001.

Career 
Sharma's involvement at CERN began in 1987 when she won a three-year fellowship to conduct research in the detector development group led by Georges Charpak. After finishing her first PhD in Delhi, Sharma moved to Geneva with her family in 1989 to conduct her post-doctoral research in gaseous detectors, through which she realized her lack of expertise in instrumentation and thus decided to pursue a second PhD at the University of Geneva.

After finishing her second PhD, Sharma held positions at the GSI-Darmstadt in Germany and the University of Maryland, College Park. By 2001, she had gained enough skills to apply for and receive a long-term position at CERN. Since 2001, she has worked on the Compact Muon Solenoid (CMS) experiment, designing high-efficiency detectors to facilitate the detection of the Higgs-Boson particle. She has mentored around 20 PhD students during her time at CERN and has authored or co-authored over 800 publications.

Research 
Sharma is best known for her work in gaseous detectors, through which she contributed to the discovery of the Higgs boson. She works at the CMS experiment in the Large Hadron Collider, developing a new muon system called GEM (Gas Electron Multiplier), which can detect muons in the outermost layer of the CMS. Detecting a muon can confirm the production of a Higgs boson, and the CMS is also important in studying other dimensions, background radiation, and the components of dark matter. Sharma is also known as a pioneer for her work on wire chambers, resistive plate chambers, and micro-pattern gaseous detectors, all of which laid the foundations for her larger work in the CMS experiment.

Select publications 

 A. Sharma, Detection of single electrons with a GEM. Nuclear Instruments and Methods in Physics Research Section A: Accelerators, Spectrometers, Detectors and Associated Equipment 471, 136–139 (2001).
 A. Sharma, 3D simulation of charge transfer in a Gas Electron Multiplier (GEM) and comparison to experiment. Nuclear Instruments and Methods in Physics Research Section A: Accelerators, Spectrometers, Detectors and Associated Equipment 454, 267–271 (2000).
 A. Shah, A. Sharma, A. Kumar, J. Merlin, Md. Naimuddin, Impact of single-mask hole asymmetry on the properties of GEM detectors. Nuclear Instruments and Methods in Physics Research Section A: Accelerators, Spectrometers, Detectors and Associated Equipment 936, 459–461 (2019).
 S. Mukherjee, A. Sharma, S. Sodaye, A. Goswami, B. S. Tomar, INCOMPLETE FUSION IN THE EXCITATION FUNCTIONS OF 12C + 115In REACTIONS AT 4–7 MeV/NUCLEON. Int. J. Mod. Phys. E 15, 237–245 (2006).
 C. Richter, et al., On the efficient electron transfer through GEM. Nuclear Instruments and Methods in Physics Research Section A: Accelerators, Spectrometers, Detectors and Associated Equipment 478, 538–558 (2002).
 F. Sauli, A. Sharma, Micro-Pattern Gaseous Detectors. Annu. Rev. Nucl. Part. Sci. 49, 341–388 (1999).

References 

People associated with CERN
Indian women physicists
University of Geneva alumni
Living people
Year of birth missing (living people)
Indian particle physicists 
People from Jhansi
Banaras Hindu University alumni